Severe Tropical Cyclone Christine was the third tropical cyclone and the second severe tropical cyclone of the 2013–14 Australian region cyclone season. It made landfall on Western Australia's Pilbara coast nearly halfway between the major towns of Karratha and Port Hedland as a category 4 cyclone on midnight of 31 December 2013.

Meteorological history

On 25 December the Australian Bureau of Meteorology reported that a broad monsoonal circulation that they had been monitoring to the northwest of Western Australia had developed a discrete centre of circulation. Over the next few days the system slowly developed further as it moved towards the south-southwest, before during 28 December the BoM reported that the system had developed into a category 1 tropical cyclone on the Australian tropical cyclone intensity scale and named it Christine.

It intensified into a Category 2 storm on 29 December, Category 3 on 30 December, and then a marginal Category 4 on the same day. Watches and warnings were issued for areas between Derby and Exmouth, extending inland beyond the Pilbara to the Mid West and Goldfields-Esperance region around Wiluna and Leinster.

Christine made landfall between Roebourne and Whim Creek while strengthening around midnight on 31 December, with the eye passing through Roebourne itself, with Wickham skirting the edge of the eye. The storm began to turn to the southeast and began to weaken slowly.

Impact

Western Australia

Upon making landfall, Christine produced heavy rainfall across a large section of the West Australian Pilbara. All mining and shipping operations were cancelled in Port Hedland, however no actual damage to mining infrastructure was reported. Roebourne and Wickham bore the brunt of Christine's winds, with a maximum confirmed gust of  recorded at Roebourne. Both towns received significant damage and according to many local residents of Wickham, Christine was the worst cyclone in recent memory; several roofs were significantly damaged and many of the towns trees were uprooted and destroyed. In Roebourne, roofs of many houses collapsed under the weight of water or were ripped off by wind gusts, while the whole town lost electricity for a short period. Karratha and Port Hedland were spared any major damage, apart from minor flooding and wind-related damage. As Christine moved inland, flooding closed the Great Northern Highway north of Newman, however the town itself received  wind gusts and only  of rain.

An estimated 3–4.5 tonnes of iron ore was lost in exports across the Pilbara region due to Christine. Mining operations and shipments were suspended for three days, though most of the facilities sustained only minor damage if any. Despite the storm, Port Hedland reported a record monthly export of 29.9 million tonnes in December 2013, with 28.5 million tonnes being iron ore. This surpassed the previous record set in September 2013 by roughly 300,000 tonnes.

Elsewhere
As the remnant low of Christine moved south-eastwards and into South Australia, it combined with a thermal low whipping up gusty winds and causing extreme heat across central Australia. Further south however, Christine's remnants caused light showers and a cooler change in the Adelaide area, while isolated thunderstorms caused  of rain to fall in Eucla, more than triple the areas monthly average. Victoria and southern New South Wales also recorded light rain and a cooler change from Christine's remnants, with Melbourne reporting  and maximum temperatures in the low 20 °C's during the New Years period.

The name Christine was replaced with Catherine in 2014, but the name has not been confirmed as retired.

See also

Cyclone Lua 
Cyclone Rusty
Cyclone George
Cyclone Gwenda

References

External links

Category 4 Australian region cyclones
2013 in Australia
Tropical cyclones in Western Australia
2013–14 Australian region cyclone season
Retired Australian region cyclones
Christine
2010s in Western Australia